State Correctional Institution – Somerset is a medium-security, all-male correctional facility located outside Somerset, Pennsylvania, about 70 miles southeast of Pittsburgh, and about five miles off the Somerset Interchange of the Pennsylvania Turnpike.

Construction of SCI - Somerset
SCI – Somerset was constructed at a cost of $82 million and was completed in 1993. The prison was constructed on the site of a farm. The campus covers 63 acres, inside and outside the perimeter fence.

See also
List of Pennsylvania state prisons

References

Prisons in Pennsylvania
Buildings and structures in Somerset County, Pennsylvania
1993 establishments in Pennsylvania